Leandro Taub is an Argentinian actor, author and motivational speaker that was born on May 5, 1983 in Buenos Aires and raised in Bariloche. As actor he debuted as the poet Enrique Lihn in Alejandro Jodorowsky's film Endless Poetry. He wrote 5 books and one of them is Sabiduría Casera.

Early life and education 
Taub comes from a Polish-Jewish family. He got his degrees as Bachelor in Economics and Master in Finance in the University of CEMA He also studied Numerology, Yoga, Kabbalah, Shamanism, Tarot and Alchemy.

Career 
Taub started his career as a financial analyst. By age of 23, began working as an investment advisor. He has also worked in a hedge fund and for organizations in several countries such as the US and the UAE.

By age of 24, after a life crisis he left Argentina and traveled around the globe before finding his purpose in life.

In 2011 he worked with the Argentinean musician Fito Páez for the music video London Town. In the same year, Taub published his first book Sabiduría Casera (Homemade Wisdom) with the Jnana Yogi, Lou Couture and became a bestseller that year. Following the publishing of his first book, he became a friend of Chilean-French filmmaker, Alejandro Jodorowsky who wrote the introduction of Taub's third book La Mente Oculta (The Hidden Mind), and invited Taub two years later to play the role at Endless Poetry that premiered at Cannes Film Festival in 2016.

During his career, Taub wrote 5 books and 27 audiobooks on the topics about Kabbalah, Buddhism, Yoga, Shamanism, Tarot, and Numerology, and gave lectures in Argentina, Mexico and Chile about his books and work.

In 2021, he made his feature film directorial debut with drama film, Externo which earned a 100% approval rating on Rotten Tomatoes based on 5 reviews.

Filmography

Featured

Documentary

Short films

Upcoming 
 The Dream of the Guest: with the actors Amanda Plummer, Jean-Marc Barr, John Robinson, Lizzie Brocheré and Udo Kier, co-produced by the German producer Peter Rommel.

Books

Personal life 
In 2015 he was the boyfriend of the Argentinean actress Celeste Cid.

External links
Official website

References 

1983 births
Living people
Male actors from Buenos Aires
Argentine Jews
Argentine male film actors
Argentine people of Polish-Jewish descent
Jewish Argentine male actors